Treasure Hill is a community in Taipei, Taiwan. Originally an illegal settlement, it was founded by the Kuomintang military veterans at the end of the 1940s and served originally as an anti-aircraft position. 

After cooperating with non-governmental organization Global Artivists Participation Project, the Taipei City Government developed the area into an example of environmentally sustainable urban community. With the policy of preservation and revitalization, the old settlement unfolded a new vision of an artivist compound which would respect the existing fabric of the community while fulfilling the regeneration concept of "symbiosis" to incorporate production and ecology in communal living and ushering in the program of an international youth hostel and creative ideas of art to further cultural exchanges with broader international communities. 

Commissioned by the municipal government to propose an ecological masterplan for the area, Finnish architect Marco Casagrande found that this settlement, perhaps because of its illegal and marginal status, has evolved organically to operate according to an ecological model: recycling and filtering grey water, using minimal amounts of electricity (“stolen” from the city grid), composting organic waste, and repurposing Taipei’s waste. Casagrande relates his experiences of working on the site: For the ecological urban laboratory I had to do nothing, it was already there. What I did was to construct wooden stairways and connections between the destroyed houses and some shelters for the old residents to play mah-jong and ping-pong. 

The community has been featured in The New York Times as one of Taiwan's must-see destinations. 

Treasure Hill is the attic of Taipei carrying the memories, stories and traditions of the past generations. In some way it is a reflection of the Taipei mind that the industrial city is not able to reflect. For the stories to surface the industrial city must be turned over: the city must be a compost. —Marco Casagrande 

Police closed the area in 2007 in order to guarantee safety for restoration work. The restored Treasure Hill reopened as an artist village in 2010 with only 22 original families managing to move back to the settlement. The restoration process has been criticized to have caused the neighbourhood to be stripped of its prior residents and turned into a space which celebrates individual expression and artistic creativity at the expense of housing lower income families.

Urban farming
The Treasure Hill community is located by the Xindian River, which was an important lifeline for the settlement providing drinking water, fish and gravel for construction work before the river got polluted. The community used to have extensive urban farms between the settlement and the river. 
"The pollution comes from the up-stream." - Missis Chen, the leader of the Treasure Hill original community.

Transportation
The hill is accessible within walking distance south of Gongguan Station of Taipei Metro.

See also

 Military dependents' village

References 

Urban planning in Taiwan
History of Taipei
Squatting in Taiwan